This is a list of turnpike roads, built and operated by private companies in exchange for the privilege of collecting a toll, in the U.S. state of New Jersey, mainly in the 19th century. While most of the roads are now maintained as free public roads, some have been abandoned. {
  "type": "ExternalData",
  "service": "page",
  "title": "New Jersey Turnpikes.map"
}

Turnpikes in Name Only 
The following is a list of roads in New Jersey that are, or have been, called turnpikes, despite there being no evidence of a company tolling the road

References 
Thomas F. Gordon, A Gazetteer of the State of New Jersey, 1834, pp. 17–18

Toll roads in New Jersey
New Jersey
Turnpikes in New Jersey